The 17th edition of the Men's Asian Amateur Boxing Championships was held from 14 to 21 January 1994 in Tehran, Iran.

Medal summary

Medal table

References

External links
Official Results

Asian Amateur Boxing Championships
Asian Boxing
Boxing
1994 Asian